Herrick Township may refer to:

Herrick Township, Shelby County, Illinois
Herrick Township, Knox County, Nebraska
Herrick Township, Bradford County, Pennsylvania
Herrick Township, Susquehanna County, Pennsylvania
Herrick Township, Deuel County, South Dakota, in Deuel County, South Dakota

Township name disambiguation pages